Victoria Eugenia Villarruel (born 13 April 1975) is an Argentinian lawyer and activist who is the founder and president of the Centro de Estudios Legales sobre el Terrorismo y sus Víctimas, known as CELTYV (in English, the Center for Legal Studies on Terrorism), an organization which seeks justice for the victims of the left-wing guerrillas during the Dirty War.

Early life and education
Villarruel was born on 13 April 1975. Her grandfather was a historian who was employed by the Argentinian Navy and who, according to her, survived four guerrilla bombings, while her father was a high-ranked Army member.

In 2008, she took a course in Inter-Agency Coordination and Combating Terrorism at the William J. Perry Center for Hemispheric Defense Studies, a U.S. Department of Defense institution based at the National Defense University in Washington, D.C.

Career
Speaking at the Oslo Freedom Forum in 2011, Villarruel challenged what she described as the “official history” of modern Argentina. According to that history, terrorism took place more or less exclusively during the so-called “dirty war” of 1976–83, when the nation was under a Military Junta; Villarruel's point of view was that organized terrorism also occurred in Argentina in 1973–76, when it had a democratic government. She denounced that the two major Argentinian guerrillas of that era, the People's Revolutionary Army and Montoneros, had links with the Castro regime in Cuba and with the Palestinian Liberation Organization, with at least one of the groups training islamists in the Middle East and supplying the PLO with weapons that were used in deadly attacks on Israel. From 1969 to 1980, according to Villarruel, over 21,000 terrorist attacks were committed in Argentina, which averages out to seven per day. Villarruel maintained that this history was later covered up by the Kirchner government, that the terrorists of the 1970s went on to enjoy the Kirchners' protection, and that many of those former terrorists, as of 2011, held positions of responsibility in the Argentinian establishment – for example, as civil servants or journalists.

By contrast, the thousands of anonymous Argentinian citizens who were assassinated, kidnapped, tortured, crippled for life, or otherwise impacted by terrorism continued, under the Cristina Kirchner administration, to be deprived of recognition as victims and were not taken into account in government policies relating to the period during which those terrorist actions were committed. These victims, Villarruel asserted, have spent decades awaiting justice and watching helplessly from the sidelines while the government protected their assailants instead of supporting the victims' own rights. No effort to secure rights for these victims, noted Villarruel, have ever succeeded in Argentinian courts; on the contrary, judges have consistently served as “guarantors of terrorists' impunity.” In her talk, Villarruel also accused the Kirchner government of acting in complicity with Iran.

In a 2011 interview, Villarruel asserted that even opposition politicians in Argentina avoided speaking about the victims of 1970s terrorism, while members of the Kirchner government treated them as if they didn't exist and, consequently, a generation of Argentinians has grown up ignorant of the complete history of that period. She said that CELTYV had so far managed to identify by name 13,074 victims of terrorists (of which 1,010 were assassinated), and added that this figure was only “preliminary.” Nevertheless, her work, which was published in her book Los otros muertos, has severe methodological problems since she included 84 N.N., victims dated before the foundation of the groups she dennouces as terrorists, victims of other groups such as the Argentine Anticommunist Alliance and could not difference between civilian deaths and military casualties.

After the end of the Kirchner era in early 2016, Villarruel complained that during the presidencies of both Néstor and Cristina Kirchner, the leftist guerrillas of earlier decades had been rehabilitated, pardoned, and even “glorified” by the government. Meanwhile, those terrorists' victims have been denied justice. Villarruel lamented that these former terrorists enjoyed widespread sympathy in Argentina because they had purportedly been rebelling against the military dictatorship, even though, according to her, the majority of their crimes had in fact been committed during the three years of democracy immediately prior to the 1976 military coup. Because of her criticism of the terrorists and of their rehabilitation, Villarruel has been accused of defending the Dirty War. “In Argentina,” she has said, “if you don't support the guerrillas, people assume you support the dictatorship.” She has received numerous threats, and consequently is obliged to take extensive precautions.

Villarruel signed the Madrid Charter, a document drafted by the far-right Spanish party Vox that describes left-wing groups as enemies of Ibero-America involved in a "criminal project" that are "under the umbrella of the Cuban regime".

Electoral history

Books
Los llaman... jovenes idealistas (They are called... young idealists).

The Other Dead (Los Otros Muertos). Co-written with Carlos Manfroni

Other professional activities
Villarruel has lectured on human rights and the victims of terrorism in many countries around the world, including the U.S., Norway, Spain, Italy, France, Colombia, Uruguay, Peru, and Mexico. She has also been interviewed by the Wall Street Journal, the Spanish newspaper ABC, and many other major world media.

References

External links
CELTYV

1975 births
Argentine anti-communists
Argentine women lawyers
Argentine women activists
Living people
Signers of the Madrid Charter
21st-century Argentine lawyers